The 2010 Internationaux de Strasbourg was a tennis tournament played on outdoor clay court. It was the 24th edition of the Internationaux de Strasbourg, and was part of the International-level tournaments of the 2010 WTA Tour. It took place at the Centre Sportif de Hautepierre in Strasbourg, France, from 17 May until 22 May 2010.

Entrants

Seeds

 Seedings are based on the rankings of May 10, 2010.

Other entrants
The following players received wildcards into the main draw:
  Maria Sharapova
  Pauline Parmentier
  Virginie Razzano
  Kristina Mladenovic 

The following players received entry from the qualifying draw:
  Dia Evtimova 
  Maria Elena Camerin 
  Mariana Duque Mariño 
  Sorana Cîrstea 

The following player received the lucky loser spot:
  Stéphanie Foretz

Finals

Singles

 Maria Sharapova defeated  Kristina Barrois, 7–5, 6–1

Doubles

 Alizé Cornet /  Vania King defeated  Alla Kudryavtseva /  Anastasia Rodionova, 3–6, 6–4, [10–7]

References
Official website

Internationaux de Strasbourg
Internationaux de Strasbourg
2010 in French tennis
May 2010 sports events in France